Catapyrgus is a genus of gastropods belonging to the family Tateidae. 

The species of this genus are found in New Zealand.

Species:

Catapyrgus fraterculus 
Catapyrgus jami 
Catapyrgus matapango 
Catapyrgus sororius 
Catapyrgus spelaeus

References

 Climo, F.M. (1974). Description and affinities of the subterranean molluscan fauna of New Zealand. New Zealand Journal of Zoology 1: 247–284.

Tateidae
Gastropod genera